Hapit Ibrahim (born 12 May 1993) is an Indonesian professional footballer who plays for Liga 2 club Deltras as a defensive midfielder.

Club career

Sriwijaya
Hapit was born in Jakarta, Indonesia and made his debut with the main team of Sriwijaya on 15 September 2013 against Persiba Balikpapan at the Persiba Stadium, Balikpapan. he played replace Diego Michiels at 80th minutes.

PSIS Semarang (loan)
He was signed for PSIS Semarang to play in the Liga 1 in the 2018 season, on loan from Sriwijaya. Hapit made his league debut on 25 March 2018 in a match against PSM Makassar at the Andi Mattalatta Stadium, Makassar.

Muba Babel United
He was signed for Muba Babel United to play in Liga 2 in the 2020 season. This season was suspended on 27 March 2020 due to the COVID-19 pandemic. The season was abandoned and was declared void on 20 January 2021.

PSPS Riau
In 2021, Hapit signed a contract with Indonesian Liga 2 club PSPS Riau in the 2021 season. He made his league debut on 3 November 2021 in a match against Semen Padang at the Kaharudin Nasution Rumbai Stadium, Pekanbaru.

Deltras
Hapit was signed for Deltras to play in Liga 2 in the 2022–23 season.

Honours

Club 
Sriwijaya U-21
 Indonesia Super League U-21: 2012–13

References

External links
 Hapit Ibrahim at Soccerway
 Hapit Ibrahim at Liga Indonesia

1993 births
Living people
Indonesian footballers
Sportspeople from Jakarta
Sriwijaya F.C. players
PSIS Semarang players
Liga 1 (Indonesia) players
Liga 2 (Indonesia) players
Association football midfielders